Middleton Priors is a village in Shropshire. The hamlet of Middleton Baggot lies less than a mile to its east. The population is shown under Ditton Priors.

Etymology
The etymology is doubtful. The name was recorded as Mittilton .

See also
Listed buildings in Ditton Priors

References
Dictionary of English Place-Names, A.D. Mills, 2002

External links

Villages in Shropshire